The Other Woman is the debut solo album by guitarist/singer/songwriter Ray Parker Jr. released in 1982 on the Arista label. The album was remastered and expanded by Funky Town Grooves in June 2012 including 3 bonus tracks.

Track listing

Personnel 
 Ray Parker Jr. – lead and backing vocals, pianos, synthesizers, guitars, bass, drums (1-4, 6, 7, 8)
 Michael Boddicker – vocoder
 Larry Tolber – drums (5)
 Ollie E. Brown – percussion
 Charles Green – saxophones, flute
 Arnell Carmichael – backing vocals 
 Jerry Knight – backing vocals 
 J.D. Nicholas – backing vocals 
 Anita Sherman – backing vocals 
 Lynn Smith – backing vocals

Production
 Ray Parker Jr. – producer, engineer, mixing 
 Ollie E. Brown – co-producer (2)
 Steve Halquist – assistant engineer 
 Bernie Grundman – mastering at A&M Studios (Hollywood, California)
 Ria Lewerke Shapiro – art direction, design 
 Leon Lecash – photography 
 Sue Reilly – lettering 
 Cindy Lecash – stylist
 Sandoura – hair design

Charts

Weekly charts

Year-end charts

See also
List of number-one R&B albums of 1982 (U.S.)

References

External links
 
 The Other Woman at Discogs
 Official Website
 Facebook Page
 My Space Page
 Soulwalking page
 Ray Parker Jr 2012 Audio Interview at Soulinterviews.com

1982 debut albums
Ray Parker Jr. albums
Arista Records albums
Albums produced by Ray Parker Jr.